Emotional is the fourth studio album by American R&B duo and brothers K-Ci & JoJo, released on November 26, 2002 on MCA Records. Recording sessions took place at K-Ci & JoJo's home in Los Angeles, California during 2002. Production was handled by JoJo and several other recording producers, including Babyface, Rodney Jerkins and Mike Smoov, including others. It produced two singles: "It's Me" and "This Very Moment", with the latter charting on the US Hot R&B/Hip-Hop Songs.

Commercial performance
The album peaked at number 61 on the US Billboard 200 and number 18 on the Top R&B/Hip-Hop Albums. It was the first K-Ci & JoJo album to not chart internationally nor be certified by the Recording Industry Association of America . The second single, "This Very Moment", was featured in the 2003 movie Deliver Us From Eva.

Critical response

Upon its release, Emotional has received mixed reviews from critics.

Track listing
"Intro"
"This Very Moment"
"Special"
"It's Me"
"I Don't Want"
"Say Yes"
"Down for Life"
"Goodbye"
"So Emotional"
"Love Me Carefully"
"I Don't Mind"
"How Can I Trust You?"
"How Long"
"Baby Yeah Yeah (Movin' It)" (featuring Mr. Cheeks) [UK Bonus Track]
 Bonus Track (japan release) "Can't Get Enough"

Personnel
Credits for Emotional adapted from Allmusic.

 Darrell "Delite" Allamby – Bass, Drums, Engineer, Keyboards, Mixing, Percussion, Producer, Programming, Vocals (Background)
 Merc Arceneaux – Groomer
 Babyface – Bass, Drum Programming, Guitar (Acoustic), Keyboards, Producer, Vocals (Background)
 Eric Hernandez – Producer
 Paul Boutin – Engineer
 Stuart Brawley – Engineer
 Craig Brockman & Eric Hernandez – Keyboards, Producer
 Lincoln Browder – Vocals (Background)
 Sekou Bunch – Bass (Electric)
 Steven Carty – Photography
 Michael Chavez – A&R Assistance
 Rob Chiarelli – Mixing
 LaShawn Daniels – Producer
 Manuel J. Donayre – Art Direction, Design
 DeVere Duckett – Vocals (Background)
 Nathan East – Bass
 Paul Foley – Digital Editing
 Jeffery Freeman – Keyboards
 Bill Meyers – Keyboards* Jon Gass – Engineer, Mixing
 Serban Ghenea – Mixing
 Alicia Graham – A&R
 Gene Grimaldi & Eric Hernandez – Mastering
 Cedric "K-Ci" Hailey – Executive Producer, Vocals, Vocals (Background)
 Kim Hansen – Keyboards

 Jean-Marie Horvat – Mixing
 Rodney Jerkins – Producer
 Shawn Joseph – Digital Editing
 Chris Justice – Digital Editing, Drums, Editing, Engineer, Guitar, Guitar (Nylon String), Percussion, Programming
 Jolie Levine-Aller – Production Coordination
 Jud Mahoney – Vocals (Background)
 Manny Marroquin – Mixing
 Harvey Mason, Jr. – Producer
 Harvey Mason, Sr. – Percussion, Tympani [Timpani]
 Bill Meyers – Keyboards
 Emanuel Officer – Producer, Vocals (Background)
 Tim Owens – Producer, Vocals (Background)
 Tichina Arnold Vocals (Background)
 Dave Pensado – Engineer, Mixing
 Jeff Redd – A&R, Executive Producer
 Michael Ripoll – Guitar
 Tim Roberts – Mixing Assistant
 J. Peter Robinson – Design
 Ivy Skoff – Production Coordination
 Mike Smoov & Eric Hernandez – Bass, Drum Programming, Guitar, Keyboards, Producer
 Tangaray – Vocals (Background)
 Damon Thomas – Producer
 Michael Hart Thompson – Guitar
 Adrian Van Velsen – Sequencing
 Bill Wathen – Mixing
 Myron Robertson - Talk Box Vocals

Charts

Weekly charts

Year-end charts

References

External links
 
 [ Emotional] at Billboard

2002 albums
K-Ci & JoJo albums